Reza Mohammadi (born February 11, 1986) is an Iranian football goalkeeper who plays for Damash Gilan in the Azadegan League.

Career

Early years 
Mohammadi started his career at Shahab Zanjan. He would later join Moghavemat Sepasi and then Paykan. However, he didn't get much first team action and in the 2010–11 season he played for Iranjavan in the Azadegan League.

Sepahan 
In July 2011, he joined Sepahan with a two-year contract. In the 2011–12 season, he played two times for Sepahan in 2011–12 Iran Pro League and once in the 2011 AFC Champions League. His best appearance for Sepahan was in the return-leg match against Al-Sadd in the Quarter-Finals of 2011 AFC Champions League.

Persepolis 
He was transferred to Persepolis with a three-year contract as part of Shahab Gordan's contract with Sepahan. He played his first, and only match for Persepolis in the 2012–13 season final fixture against Tractor Sazi, which they lost 3–1.

Naft Masjed Soleyman 
Mohammadi left Persepolis on 20 June 2014, after the club released him from his contract. He joined newly promoted Naft Masjed Soleyman on 23 June 2014 and played his first match against Saipa which he kept a clean sheet.

Club career statistics

Honours 
Sepahan
 Iran Pro League (1): 2011–12

Persepolis
 Iran Pro League: 2013–14 (Runner-up)
 Hazfi Cup: 2012–13 (Runner-up)

References 

1986 births
Living people
Iranian footballers
Sepahan S.C. footballers
Persepolis F.C. players
Iranjavan players
Paykan F.C. players
Fajr Sepasi players
Association football goalkeepers
People from Karaj
21st-century Iranian people